This is a list of natural springs in the Ozark Plateau ordered by spring magnitude.  Different sources may give differing values for average daily flow of the same spring.  This can result from different measuring methodologies and from a varying number of observations over different timespans.  The sources for the flow data presented here are cited in the footnotes.  The majority of these springs have been measured less than 10 times, at random intervals.  The exceptions are Big Spring, Greer Spring, Mammoth Spring, Bennett Spring, Maramec Spring, Alley Spring, and Round Spring, which have all been measured for more than 3 years on a daily basis by the United States Geological Survey (USGS).

List 
Some sources give million gallons per day, which is equivalent to 1.547229 ft3/s. Some second magnitude springs could be considered first magnitude, and vice versa, depending on the data used.  This list includes only some of the larger second order springs, and the number of third magnitude springs in the Ozarks numbers in the thousands.

See also
List of Missouri rivers
List of Arkansas rivers

Notes

References
Springs of Missouri, Vineyard and Feder, Missouri Department of Natural Resources, Division of Geology and Land Survey in cooperation with U.S. Geological Survey and Missouri Department of Conservation, 1982